Psilolemma is a genus of plants in the grass family. The only known species is Psilolemma jaegeri, native to the Democratic Republic of the Congo, Kenya, Uganda and Tanzania.

A wiry, somewhat spiny perennial mat-grass 7–35 cm tall with long, tough, thin, wide-spreading stolons and pungent-smelling leaves. Glaucous or yellowish shoots of numerous bristly leaves form dense tufts at the stolon nodes. Stems are leafy, slender, with bulbous bases. Leaf-blades are stiff and 0.5–7 cm. long, 1.5–2 mm. wide, with sheaths that usually overlap and 0.3–0.75 mm. long ligules. Flowering clusters are narrow and 3.5–12 cm. long.

References

Chloridoideae
Monotypic Poaceae genera
Flora of Africa